Brookfield Center may refer to:
Brookfield Center, Connecticut, a census-designated place
Brookfield Center Historic District (Brookfield, Connecticut), within the CDP
Brookfield Center, Ohio, a census-designated place
Brookfield Place (New York City), a mixed-use complex in Battery Park City, New York City